Novo Selo is a town in the municipality of Gjorče Petrov, North Macedonia.

Demographics
In statistics gathered by Vasil Kanchov in 1900, the village was inhabited by 300 Muslim Albanians and 208 Orthodox Bulgarians. 

According to the 2002 census, the town had a total of 8349 inhabitants. Ethnic groups in the town include:

Macedonians 7082
Romani 869
Serbs 274
Turks 26
Albanians 14
Vlachs 14
Bosniaks 5
Others 68

References

External links

Villages in Ǵorče Petrov Municipality
Albanian communities in North Macedonia